Foshan Prison is a prison in the Gaoming District of Foshan City, Guangdong Province, China. It was established as Xijiang Mengjiang Laogai Farm in 1958, and renamed Foshan Prison in 1995. Its inmates once mined ore at the adjacent Fuwan Xijiang Manganese Mine, whose deposits are now exhausted. They now produce rattan and wool goods.

See also

Other prisons in Guangdong:

 Jiangmen Prison
 Panyu Prison
 Gaoming Prison
 Jiaoling Prison
 Lianping Prison

References

External links 

Official site of the Guangdong Prison Administrative Bureau - Foshan Prison

Prisons in Guangdong
1958 establishments in China
Buildings and structures in Foshan